Illustrious is a 2008 album by rapper Big Noyd. The album was executive produced by Lil' Fame of rap duo M.O.P. The first single released was "Things Done Changed", for which a video was shot. This album has been criticized as it deviates from his raw and gritty style to a more bubblegum style.

This album is significant in the sense that it's the first Big Noyd album not to feature Mobb Deep on any songs.

Track listing

References

2008 albums
Big Noyd albums